Cretodus is an extinct genus of large mackerel sharks belonging to the proposed family Pseudoscapanorhynchidae. Cretodus lived during the Late Cretaceous, ranging from the Cenomanian to the Coniacian (approximately 100 to 89 million years ago). The genus is well-known from strata deposited in the Western Interior Seaway (North America), and from the Late Cretaceous of Europe, Africa, and possibly Asia. Cretodus is primarily represented in the fossil record by isolated teeth and vertebral centra, though a couple of associated dentitions and vertebral columns have been found.

Description
Prior to 2017, Cretodus was mainly known from isolated teeth. The discovery of a virtually complete skeleton suggests the genus possessed a body similar in form to the modern tiger shark, with a wide head that was equipped with powerful jaws, and a stout body. The morphology of Cretodus' placoid scales and vertebral centra suggest a moderate swimming speed, less than that of the fast-cruising contemporaneous macropredatory shark, Cretoxyrhina.

Size estimation is only reasonable for the few associated partial skeletons known. Amalfitano et al.

Dentition 
Cretodus teeth have lateral cusplets that are much smaller than the main cusp and well-separated from it, but connected by enamel on the labial face. The enamel surface is smooth, except near the base of the crown, where it forms vertical striae or costulae (grooves and ridges), a feature more prominent on the lingual face. The root is bilobate and has a massive shelf-like lingual root protuberance which diminishes in size in posterior positions.

Growth

Paleoecology 
Cretodus predated on large prey, and is suggested to have specialized in marine turtles, based on inferred stomach contents (a  chelonioid turtle) of a specimen of C. crassidens found in Italy. A predator-prey relationship has also been inferred between C. houghtonorum and hybodont sharks based on stomach contents.

The distribution of fossils of C. crassidens suggests a largely cosmopolitan distribution and a preference for offshore areas in contrast with other species in the genus (e.g. C. houghtonorum), which preferred shallow water.

Within the Western Interior Seaway, Cretodus lived among a number of other genera of shark including Cretoxyrhina, Squalicorax, Ptychodus, Cretalamna, Scapanorhynchus, and hybodont sharks. In order to coexist, these sharks likely practiced resource partitioning, by occupying different regions (e.g. nearshore v.s. offshore) or specializing in different prey items.

Species 
Shimada & Everhart (2019) attributed the following species to the genus, asserting they were chronospecies belonging to three grades of crown broadness.

 Cretodus longiplicatus
 Cretodus semiplicatus
 Cretodus gigantea
 Cretodus houghtonorum
 Cretodus crassidens

References 

Late Cretaceous fish of North America
Lamniformes
Prehistoric shark genera
Turonian life
Cretaceous sharks
Fossils of Uzbekistan
Bissekty Formation